Rob Furlong (born 11 November 1976) is a Canadian former military sniper who, from March 2002 until November 2009, held the world record for the longest confirmed sniper kill in combat, at . His record stood for over 7 years and was improved upon by Craig Harrison with a distance of  using a L115A3 Long Range Rifle.

Early life
Born on Fogo Island, Newfoundland, on 11 November 1976. In his early life Furlong taught himself to fire a rifle ambidextrously.

Military career

Inspired by a VHS tape, Furlong decided to join the military in 1997. Furlong enlisted in the Canadian Army and served with the 3rd Battalion, Princess Patricia's Canadian Light Infantry. Furlong was stationed in Bosnia in 1999 as a peace keeper.

In March 2002, Furlong participated in Operation Anaconda in Afghanistan's Shah-i-Kot Valley. His sniper team included Master Corporal Graham Ragsdale (Team Commander), Master Corporal Tim McMeekin, Master Corporal Arron Perry, and Corporal Dennis Eason. A group of three Al-Qaeda fighters was moving into a mountainside position when Furlong took aim with his long-range sniper weapon (LRSW), a .50-calibre McMillan Brothers Tac-50 rifle, loaded with Hornady A-MAX 750 gr very-low-drag bullets. He began firing at a fighter carrying an RPK machine gun. Furlong's first shot missed and his second shot hit the knapsack on the target's back. The third struck the target's torso, killing him.

This feat is not typical for the effective range with a high first-hit probability of the employed rifle on non-static targets (see maximum effective range). The shot was aided by the ambient air density in the Shah-i-Kot Valley where Furlong operated, which is significantly lower than at sea level due to its  mean elevation.

In December 2003, PPCLI snipers Master Corporal Graham Ragsdale, Master Corporal Tim McMeekin, Corporal Dennis Eason, Corporal Rob Furlong and Master Corporal Arron Perry were awarded the Bronze Star Medal by the United States Army for their actions in combat during Operation Anaconda from 2–11 March 2002.

Later career
After leaving the Canadian Army, Furlong moved to Edmonton, Alberta and joined the Edmonton Police Service in 2004, although he had considered joining Joint Task Force 2. In 2012, Furlong was dismissed from the police for discreditable conduct, after an episode in which he physically abused and urinated on a fellow police officer. , he operates a marksmanship academy, called Rob Furlong's Marksmanship Academy, based in Alberta.

See also
Longest recorded sniper kills

References

See also
List of books, articles and documentaries about snipers

Further reading
 McMillan Tac-50 article including a photo of the actual rifle Furlong used.
 Mention in Dispatch (broken link as of 03/03/2012)
 'We were abandoned': Story of the Princess Patricia's Canadian Light Infantry Snipers

External links
Link to Rob Furlong's Marksmanship Academy
Personal Interview #1
Personal Interview #2

Living people
Canadian military personnel from Newfoundland and Labrador
People from Fogo Island, Newfoundland and Labrador
Princess Patricia's Canadian Light Infantry soldiers
Canadian military personnel of the War in Afghanistan (2001–2021)
Canadian military snipers
1976 births